Graeme Cook may refer to:

Graeme G. Cook (born 1950), Australian footballer for Footscray between 1971 and 1973
Graeme M. Cook (born 1948), Australian footballer for Footscray between 1966 and 1970
Graeme Cook (racing driver), Australian sports car racing driver

See also
Graham Cook (1893–1916), New Zealand professional rugby league footballer